An Dochi (died 15 April 1363) was a Goryeo eunuch and an assistant of King Gongmin. After the King fled to Andong to escape the Hong Geonjeok's Rebellion in 1361, he came back in 1363 after the situation was settled. An then stayed at Heungwang Temple, Gyeonggi-do to served Gongmin. At the same time, Gim Yong (김용) rebelled and attacked the Temple by sending about 50 men there. An was killed by them who mistaken him as the King since he was said to look similar with Gongmin.

In popular culture
Portrayed by Kim Dong-wan in the 1983 KBS TV series Foundation of the Kingdom.
Portrayed by Lee Jung-sup in the 2005–2006 MBC TV series Shin Don.
Portrayed by Kwon-min in the 2012 SBS TV series Faith.

References

Cites and links

Books

Year of birth unknown
1363 deaths
Date of birth unknown
14th-century Korean people